Samuel Johnathan Lane (1830 – January 28, 1891) was an English-born barrister and political figure in Ontario, Canada. He represented Grey North in the House of Commons of Canada from 1878 to 1882 as a Liberal-Conservative member.

Lane served as a member of the council for Grey County in 1874 and from 1865 to 1872, serving as county warden from 1868 to 1870 and in 1872. He also served as reeve and mayor for Owen Sound. Lane was an unsuccessful candidate in Grey North in the 1874 federal election, losing to George Snider. He defeated Snider in the next general election held in 1878. Lane was defeated by Benjamin Allen when he ran for reelection in 1882. He was named junior judge for the county in 1885 and senior judge in 1889.

References 
 
The Canadian Parliamentary Companion and Annual Register, 1879 CH Mackintosh

1830 births
1891 deaths
Members of the House of Commons of Canada from Ontario
Conservative Party of Canada (1867–1942) MPs
Mayors of Owen Sound
Judges in Ontario